Magnetic Fields was a British game development company founded in February 1982 and best known for developers Shaun Southern and Andrew Morris. The company was originally named "Mr Chip Software" but renamed "Magnetic Fields (Software Design) Ltd." usually simply referred to as "Magnetic Fields", in 1988.

History 

Between 1982 and 1984 they released the developed games themselves with limited success. In 1984 they ceased publishing games themselves and instead developed for Publishers Mastertronic and then later for Alternative Software, Gremlin Graphics and other publishers. Probably the best known game released under the Mr. Chip Software company name was Trailblazer which led to several sequels and ports to other systems. Most of the other games released under the Mr. Chip Software label were already focused on racing like Kikstart 2, but also some non-racing games such as Proof Of Destruction also found a fanbase. Although early development was focused on the Commodore 64 and VIC-20, the company widened the number of target platforms for their games in the mid 1980s.  One of the other platforms included the Commodore 16, which featured a few conversions (and the original version of Trailblazer), but also a number of unique titles including Arthur Noid and Bandits and Zero.  Shaun also wrote a completely different version of Kikstart for the machine to what was produced for the C64.

With the switch to the "Magnetic Fields" name the company also switched from 8-bit systems to the rather new 16-Bit systems, with their last 8-bit release being Super Scramble Simulator (a sort of silent third game in the Kikstart series). While developing games belonging to many different genres, Magnetic Fields soon focussed on racing games. The 1985 release of Formula 1 Simulator was already technically on par with the competing racing games of that time.

The company became well known in 1990 for their releases of Super Cars and Lotus Esprit Turbo Challenge on most common home computer systems of the time. Especially the strong sales on the Amiga 500 and Atari ST platforms led to sequels in 1991. All three Lotus titles had the nice additional touch of including hidden games in them, with the sequel containing Shaun's classic Duck Shoot game from the Vic 20. Lotus III: The Ultimate Challenge featured on the TV series GamesMaster (S2/E11) where it was played by Formula One driver, Johnny Herbert.

In 1996 the company released Network Q RAC Rally Championship for the MS-DOS platform which received many favourable reviews and led to several expansions and sequels, including the X-Miles and International Rally Championship. The last release of the company was Mobil 1 Rally Championship for Windows and PlayStation platforms in 1999.

In 2000 Shaun Southern and Andrew Morris founded a new company called "Eugenicy" to develop more racing games but the company was closed down before anything was ever released.
Andrew Morris released the original promotional trailer for Eugenicy on his YouTube channel in 2009.

The company has agreed to let fans distribute their 8-bit system software as long as no profit is made from these. This has led to additional interest  in the company among users of emulators for such older hardware.

Kikstart I and II were released in 2010 for the Commodore 64 emulator on the iPhone.

On 5 May 2018 a retrospective video documentary/review produced by Everything Amiga was published on the subject of Kid Chaos. It tells the story of the games' troubled development history, and assesses its impact on the Amiga scene at the time, and long after.

Former Magnetic Fields artist, Andrew Morris, agreed for a scan of his original protagonist concept artwork to be included. This was the first time it had been revealed to the public. 'Cosmic Kitten' (alternatively 'Claws') as he was then known was to be the Amiga's answers to Sonic the Hedgehog. However, before publication the character was re-designed as a caveboy known simply as 'Kid' to avoid any legal conflict with SEGA who have always been very protective of their intellectual property.

Games developed 

 Pacmania (1983)
 AD Infinitum (1984)
 Duck Shoot (1984)
 Kwazy Kwaks (1984)
 Olympic Skier (1984)
 Caves of Doom (1985)
 Hero of the Golden Talisman (1985)
 Kikstart: Off-Road Simulator (1985)
 Tutti Frutti (1985)
 Trailblazer (1986)
 Cosmic Causeway: Trailblazer II (1987)
 Lotus Esprit Turbo Challenge (1990)
 Super Cars (1990)
 Super Cars II (1991)
 Lotus II (1991)
 Lotus III (1992)
 Kid Chaos (1994)
 Supercars International (1996)
 Network Q RAC Rally Championship (1996)
 Rally Championship: The X-Miles (1997) 
 International Rally Championship (1997)
 Mobil 1 Rally Championship (1999)

Games published 

All of these games were published under the older company name Mr Chip Software.

 Pacmania (1983)
 AD Infinitum (1984)
 Kwazy Kwaks (1984)
 Olympic Skier (1984)

References

External links 
 Company description at MobyGames
  (archived version)
 Official Eugenicy website (archived version)

Video game development companies
Defunct video game companies of the United Kingdom
Video game companies established in 1982
Video game companies disestablished in 2010